Chris Ely is a professional English butler and estate manager and the former Dean of the Bespoke Institute at The French Culinary Institute in New York City. He began his career as a footman at Buckingham Palace, where he was a member of Queen Elizabeth II's household staff. In the more than three decades since, he has worked as a butler and an estate manager for employers including Joel Schumacher and Brooke Astor.

Career 
Ely began his career as a footman at Buckingham Palace, where he was a member of Queen Elizabeth II's household staff. He studied food service, French cuisine, and housekeeping at Thanet Technical College in Kent, England. He has since held positions as a houseman, valet, butler, personal assistant, and estate manager for employers in the diplomatic, business, and entertainment field. In 2010, Ely joined The French Culinary Institute to design and introduce the Bespoke Institute.

Ely today 
Ely is currently an in-home consultant and domestic staff trainer for private clients.

References

External links
 The Butler’s Way: Just So
 Chris Ely, Bespoke Institute
 Chris Ely on Martha Stewart

Living people
French cuisine
Educators from New York City
Year of birth missing (living people)
Place of birth missing (living people)